Imara pallasia is a moth in the Castniidae family. It is found in south-eastern Brazil. It is found along cloud forests.

Adults have been observed hill-topping with several Morpho and Nymphalidae species. It is thought to be a mimic of Parides ascanius.

References

Moths described in 1821
Castniidae